In economics, Epstein–Zin preferences refers to a specification of recursive utility.

A recursive utility function can be constructed from two components: a time aggregator that characterizes preferences in the absence of uncertainty and a risk aggregator that defines the certainty equivalent function that characterizes preferences over static gambles and is used to aggregate the risk associated with future utility.  With Epstein–Zin preferences, the time aggregator is a linearly homogeneous CES aggregate of current consumption and the certainty equivalent of future utility.  Specifically, the date-t utility index, for a sequence of positive scalar consumptions , that are potentially stochastic for time periods beyond date t, is defined recursively as the solution to the nonlinear stochastic difference equation

where  is a real-valued certainty equivalent operator. The parameter  determines the marginal rate of time preference, and the parameter  determines the elasticity of intertemporal substitution, . The parameter restriction  results in a time-additive von Neumann–Morgenstern expected utility index.

Importantly, unlike VNM utility functions (e.g. isoelastic utility), Epstein–Zin preferences allow the elasticity of intertemporal substitution (determined above by ) to be unrelated to risk aversion (determined above by ).

References
 
 

Utility